Bernard Gravier (20 February 1881 – 13 August 1923) was a French fencer. He won a gold medal in the team épée event at the 1908 Summer Olympics.

References

External links
 

1881 births
1923 deaths
French male épée fencers
Olympic fencers of France
Olympic gold medalists for France
Medalists at the 1908 Summer Olympics
Fencers at the 1908 Summer Olympics
Olympic medalists in fencing
20th-century French people